Mythology is a collection of myths, or the study of them.

Mythology or Mythologies may also refer to:
 Mythology (fiction) or canon, the official notion of the overarching plot of a media franchise
 Mythology (comic book), an Indian comic book created by Illustrated Orchids
 Mythology (board game), a 1980 game from Yaquinto

Books
 Mythology (book), a 1942 book by Edith Hamilton
 Mythologies (book), a 1957 book by Roland Barthes
 Mythology: Greek Gods, Heroes, & Monsters, a 2007 book by Dugald Steer

Music
 Mythology (UK band), an English band of the 1960s featuring Tony Iommi and Bill Ward, later founding members of Black Sabbath
 Mythologies (album), a 1989 album by Rhett Miller
 Mythology (Bee Gees album) (2010)
 Mythology (Derek Sherinian album) (2004)
 Mythology (Eloy Fritsch album) (2001)

See also

 Myth (disambiguation)
 Mythos (disambiguation)
 Mythopoeia